Neal Shapiro (born July 22, 1945) is an American equestrian and Olympic medalist.

Career
Shapiro was born in Brooklyn, New York, and is Jewish.

He won silver and bronze medals in show jumping at the 1972 Summer Olympics in Munich, Germany.  He is also a two-time winner of the Grand Prix of Aachen. Shapiro was inducted into the United States Show Jumping Hall of Fame in 2010.

He coached the 11-person U.S. equestrian team at the 19th Maccabiah Games (the "Jewish Olympics") in Israel in 2013.

He is the cousin of historian Edward S. Shapiro.

References

External links

1945 births
Living people
American male equestrians
Olympic silver medalists for the United States in equestrian
Equestrians at the 1972 Summer Olympics
Medalists at the 1972 Summer Olympics
Jewish sportspeople